The Chocal Formation is a geologic formation in Guatemala. The limestone formation preserves fossils dating back to the Permian period.

See also 
 List of fossiliferous stratigraphic units in Guatemala

References

Further reading 
 C. L. Rowett and J. L. Walper. 1972. Permian corals from near Huehuetenango, Guatemala. Pacific Geology 5:71-80

Geologic formations of Guatemala
Permian System of North America
Limestone formations
Formations